Jeffery Bule  (born 15 November 1991) is an association football and futsal player from the Solomon Islands. He plays as a midfielder for Suva in Fiji, as well as the Solomon Islands 11-a-side and futsal teams.

Club career
Bule played for Koloale in both legs of the 2009 OFC Champions League Final against Auckland City FC on 25 April 2009 and 3 May 2009. Koloale lost 9–4 on aggregate.

Bule played six times for Koloale in the 2010–11 season, making his first appearance in the 2–1 loss to Lautoka F.C. on 23 October 2010. On 5 February 2011, he scored his first goal in the season.

International career
Bule made his debut for the Solomon Islands on 27 July 2011 in a 0–0 draw with Vanuatu. He was also called up to the Solomon Islands' 2011 Pacific Games squad in New Caledonia. Bule played in the 7–0 win against Guam on 27 August 2011. He went on to earn his third cap in the 4–0 win over American Samoa on 30 August 2011, scoring his team's second goal in the fourteenth minute.

International goals
Scores and results list the Solomon Islands' goal tally first.

References

1991 births
Living people
Solomon Islands footballers
Solomon Islands international footballers
Association football midfielders
Futsal forwards
Solomon Islands men's futsal players
Solomon Warriors F.C. players
Marist F.C. players
2012 OFC Nations Cup players